An area of 39.1 hectares in the north-west corner of Geddington Chase has been designated a biological Site of Special Scientific Interest (SSSI). It is located south-east of Corby in Northamptonshire.

Geddington Chase is a surviving fragment of the medieval Royal Forest of Rockingham. Most of the Chase is commercially managed, and the SSSI is an area of semi-natural wet ash/maple woodland on Midland boulder clay. The ground flora is diverse, with plants including bluebell, dog's mercury, tufted hair-grass, and a few wild daffodils.

The site is private land with no public access.

References

Sites of Special Scientific Interest in Northamptonshire